Oregon Ballot Measure 106 was a ballot measure on the 2018 election ballot in the U.S. state of Oregon.

The measure, a proposed amendment to the state Constitution, would have barred the use of public funds to pay for abortions in Oregon, "except when medically necessary or required by federal law." The measure would have affected persons with Medicaid health insurance coverage and state employees. The measure was defeated by a broad margin, with 1,195,718 "no" votes (64.48%), and 658,793 "yes" (35.52%) votes.

The measure was sponsored by anti-abortion activists, who succeeded in placing the measure on the ballot in 2018 after failures in the previous three election cycles. Planned Parenthood and other groups opposed the measure.

References

106

Abortion referendums